Theodore Allison Nash II (October 29, 1932July 3, 2021) was an American competition rower and Olympic champion, rowing coach, and sports administrator.  Nash represented his country, either as a coach or athlete, at eleven separate Olympic Games since 1960.

Nash began coaching at the University of Pennsylvania, first as freshman coach from 1965, then as head coach from 1969-83. He was also a longtime supporter and icon of Penn AC.

Nash served as a pilot and first lieutenant in the Army Aviation division, teaching aviation and aerobatics.  He was a member of  the U.S. Marine Corps Reserve. While in the military, he was also an anti-guerrilla warfare instructor, an officer candidate school tactical officer for the Army and a member of the elite Green Beret, and special forces units for the Army. He was recalled four times on special "friendly" projects across the world.

Nash has been accused of sexually abusing Jennifer Fox in 1973 when she was 13 and he was 40. Nash was Fox's running instructor, while at horseback riding summer camp. 

He was born in Melrose, Massachusetts.      

Nash won a gold medal in coxless fours at the 1960 Summer Olympics and a bronze for the same event at 1964 Olympics.  He won gold medals at the 1959 and 1963 Pan American Games. 

He also coached entrepreneurs Cameron and Tyler Winklevoss in the coxless pair at the 2008 Beijing Olympics. 

Nash died at the age of 88 on July 3, 2021 in Medford, New Jersey. Nash was accused of sexually assaulting 13 year old Jennifer Fox, in 1973 while he was her coach. At the time he was 40.

References

External links

1932 births
2021 deaths
American male rowers
Olympic bronze medalists for the United States in rowing
Olympic gold medalists for the United States in rowing
Rowers at the 1960 Summer Olympics
Rowers at the 1964 Summer Olympics
Boston University Terriers rowers
Washington Huskies men's rowers
Penn Quakers rowing coaches
People from Melrose, Massachusetts
Medalists at the 1964 Summer Olympics
Medalists at the 1960 Summer Olympics
Pan American Games medalists in rowing
Pan American Games gold medalists for the United States
Rowers at the 1959 Pan American Games
Rowers at the 1963 Pan American Games
Medalists at the 1959 Pan American Games
Medalists at the 1963 Pan American Games
Sportspeople from Middlesex County, Massachusetts